John Francis Joseph Fitzgerald (25 June 1901 – 12 July 1987), also known as "Frank Fitzgerald", was an Australian rules footballer who played with Fitzroy in the Victorian Football League (VFL) and Brunswick in the Victorian Football Association (VFA).

He later served in the Australian Army in New Guinea during World War II.

Death
He died at Northcote, Victoria on 12 July 1987.

Notes

External links 

Frank Fitzgerald's playing statistics from The VFA Project

1901 births
1987 deaths
Australian rules footballers from Melbourne
Fitzroy Football Club players
Brunswick Football Club players
People from Brunswick, Victoria
Australian Army personnel of World War II
Military personnel from Melbourne